N-Arachidonyl glycine receptor (NAGly receptor), also known as G protein-coupled receptor 18 (GPR18), is a protein that in humans is encoded by the GPR18 gene. Along with the other previously "orphan" receptors GPR55 and GPR119, GPR18 has been found to be a receptor for endogenous lipid neurotransmitters, several of which also bind to cannabinoid receptors. It has been found to be involved in the regulation of intraocular pressure.

Research supports the hypothesis that GPR18 is the abnormal cannabidiol receptor and N-arachidonoyl glycine, the endogenous lipid metabolite of anandamide, initiates directed microglial migration in the CNS through activation of GPR18, though recent evidence demonstrates that NAGly was not shown to be a GPR18 agonist in rat sympathetic neurons.

Resolvin D2 (RvD2), a member of the specialized proresolving mediators (SPM) class of polyunsaturated fatty acid metabolites, is an activating ligand for GPR18; RvD2 and its activation of GPR18 contribute to the resolution of inflammatory responses as well as inflammation-based and other diseases in animal models and are proposed to do so in humans. Furthermore, RvD2 is a metabolite of the omega-3 fatty acid, docosahexaenoic acid (DHA); the metabolism of DHA to RvD2 and RvD2's activation of GPR18 is proposed to one among many other mechanisms for the anti-inflammatory and other beneficial effects attributed to omega-3 fatty acid-rich diets

Ligands
Agonists
Ligands found to bind to GPR18 as agonists include:
 N-Arachidonoylglycine (NAGly)
 Abnormal cannabidiol (Abn-CBD)
 AM-251 - partial agonist
 Cannabidiol - partial agonist
 CBG-DMH
 O-1602
 Δ9-Tetrahydrocannabinol (Δ9-THC) - THC is actually a more potent agonist at GPR18 than at CB1 or CB2, with Ki of 0.96nM at GPR18, 8.1nM at GPR55, 25.1nM at CB1 and 35.2nM at CB2.
 Anandamide (N-arachidonoyl ethanolamine, AEA)
 Arachidonylcyclopropylamide (ACPA)
 Resolvin D2 (RvD2) 
 
Antagonists
 Amauromine
 O-1918
 CID-85469571

References

Further reading

G protein-coupled receptors
Biology of bipolar disorder